Kurichi is a village in the Pattukkottai taluk of Thanjavur district, Tamil Nadu, India.

Demographics 

As per the 2001 census, Kurichi had a total population of 1523 with 741 males and 782 females. The sex ratio was 1055. The literacy rate was 75.84.

References 

 

Villages in Thanjavur district